The 2018 City of Wolverhampton Council election took place on 3 May 2018 to elect members of City of Wolverhampton Council in England. This was on the same day as other local elections.

Results

Labour strengthened its position and subsequently its majority, after winning Spring Vale from UKIP of which was the party's only ever seat in the City and also gaining the once Conservative stronghold of Penn, marking the 1st time ever that Labour have had 2 out of the 3 seats, in the ward as mentioned.

The election also saw the first victory of the Conservative's Jane Stevenson within the Tettenhall Wightwick ward, who then was elected as Member of Parliament for Wolverhampton North East, at the 2019 United Kingdom general election.

The Composition of the Council as a result of May 3, 2018 stood at:

The specific change in seats, from the election was:

Labour - 51 (+2 Seats)

Conservative - 9 (-1 Seats)

UKIP - 0 (-1 Seat)

Results Breakdown - parties who stood no candidates in this election, but did in 2016 are not shown in the table

Candidates

Bilston East

Bilston North

Blakenhall

Bushbury North

Bushbury South and Low Hill

East Park

Ettingshall

Fallings Park

Graiseley

Heath Town

Merry Hill

Oxley

Park

Penn

Spring Vale

St Peter’s

Tettenhall Regis

Tettenhall Wightwick

Wednesfield North

Wednesfield South

References

2018 English local elections
2018
2010s in the West Midlands (county)